The 2011 Toronto Blue Jays season was the 35th season of Major League Baseball's Toronto Blue Jays franchise, and the 22nd full season of play (23rd overall) at the Rogers Centre. It was also the first season with John Farrell as the team's manager. The Blue Jays had an up-and-down season, finishing with an 81–81 record, in fourth place in the American League East.

AL East

Records vs opponents

Season summary
Following an unexpectedly successful 2010 season, one of the Blue Jays' priorities was to find a replacement for retiring manager Cito Gaston. After reviewing many candidates, the Blue Jays vetted four finalists, Sandy Alomar Jr., DeMarlo Hale, John Farrell and their third base coach Brian Butterfield. The Jays hired Farrell on October 22, 2010.

Relief pitcher Scott Downs declined arbitration, becoming a free agent; he signed with the Los Angeles Angels of Anaheim on December 10, 2010. Catcher John Buck was also expected to leave, as GM Alex Anthopoulos and several commentators noted that he deserved a full-time job and contract coming off an all-star season, but that the Jays would be looking to prospect J. P. Arencibia as their starting catcher, after he hit .301 with 32 home runs in 104 Triple-A games.

The Jays made several notable acquisitions through free agency, including relievers Jon Rauch and Octavio Dotel. On November 17, 2010, the Blue Jays traded for outfielder Rajai Davis from the Oakland Athletics in exchange for two minor league pitchers Trystan Magnuson and Danny Farquhar.

On January 21, the Blue Jays announced a blockbuster deal that sent the face of the franchise, Vernon Wells, to the Los Angeles Angels of Anaheim, in exchange for catcher/first baseman Mike Napoli and outfielder Juan Rivera. Four days later, the Blue Jays traded Napoli to the Texas Rangers for reliever Frank Francisco, Rivera was Designated for assignment by the Blue Jays on July 3, 2011, and acquired by the Los Angeles Dodgers with cash for a player to be named later or cash back.

On February 17, the Blue Jays announced that José Bautista had agreed to a five-year contract extension worth $64 million. Bautista led the MLB with 54 home runs, won the AL Hank Aaron Award and placed fourth in MVP balloting in 2010.

On June 1, in a game against the Cleveland Indians, Eric Thames, Rajai Davis and Jayson Nix hit back-to-back-to-back triples for the first time in franchise history. It was also the first time in the Major Leagues since Mike Gates, Tim Raines and Tim Wallach of the Montreal Expos accomplished this incredibly rare feat back in 1981.

On July 27, the Blue Jays completed a three-team trade to acquire long sought-after center fielder Colby Rasmus from the St. Louis Cardinals. In total, the trade involved many players, with Rasmus, P. J. Walters, Brian Tallet, and Trever Miller traded from St. Louis to Toronto, Mark Teahen traded from the Chicago White Sox to Toronto, Zach Stewart and Jason Frasor traded from Toronto to Chicago, Edwin Jackson traded to the St. Louis Cardinals from the Chicago White Sox (through Toronto), along with outfielder Corey Patterson, relief pitchers Octavio Dotel, and Marc Rzepczynski. The trade was seen as a watershed moment in the Blue Jays development process in the Anthopoulous regime, providing the team a multi-tooled centre fielder to anchor a young, developing outfield trio.

On July 31, the Blue Jays retired their first number, Roberto Alomar's #12.

On August 10, ESPN reported a cover story claiming the Toronto Blue Jays organization engaged in sign stealing from visiting teams at the Rogers Centre, during the 2010 season. The story, by Peter Keating and Amy K. Nelson, alleged that a man in white, sitting in the outfield crowd, was raising his arms above his head to indicate an off-speed pitch. While the story was not validated by visiting players, managers or other MLB organizations, the Blue Jays responded with a press conference to denounce the allegations.

On August 23, Aaron Hill and John McDonald were traded to the Arizona Diamondbacks in exchange for second baseman Kelly Johnson.

In August, J. P. Arencibia broke the Blue Jays single-season record for most home runs by a catcher, finishing the year with 23. Russell Martin would later tie this record in 2015.

2011 Draft picks

The 2011 MLB draft was held on  June 7–9.

 * The Blue Jays received the 35th pick as compensation for loss of free agent Scott Downs
 * The Blue Jays received the 46th pick as compensation for loss of free agent John Buck
 * The Blue Jays received the 53rd pick as compensation for loss of free agent Miguel Olivo
 * The Blue Jays received the 57th pick as compensation for loss of free agent Kevin Gregg
 * The Blue Jays received the 74th pick as a compensation pick from the Los Angeles Angels of Anaheim for signing type-A free agent Scott Downs

Roster

Top prospects

* According to Baseball America Top 100 Prospects

* According to Scouting Book Top Minor League Prospects

* Top 10 Blue Jays prospects via Baseball America

Game log

Regular season

|-  style="text-align:center; background:#cfc;"
| 1 || April 1 || Twins || 13–3 || Romero (1–0) || Pavano (0–1) || || 47,984 || 1–0 || –
|-  style="text-align:center; background:#cfc;"
| 2 || April 2 || Twins || 6–1 || Drabek (1–0) || Liriano (0–1) || || 27,194 || 2–0 || –
|-  style="text-align:center; background:#fbb;"
| 3 || April 3 || Twins || 4–3 || Blackburn (1–0) || Cecil (0–1) || Nathan (1)  || 35,505 || 2–1 || 1
|- style="text-align:center; background:#cfc;"
| 4 || April 5 || Athletics || 7–6 (10) || Frasor (1–0) || Balfour (0–1)  ||  || 11,077 ||  3–1  || 1
|- style="text-align:center; background:#cfc;"
| 5 || April 6 || Athletics || 5–3 || Litsch (1–0) || Braden (0–1) || Rauch (1) || 11,684 ||  4–1  || –
|-  style="text-align:center; background:#fbb;"
| 6 || April 7 || Athletics || 2–1 || Cahill (1–0)  || Frasor (1–1) || Fuentes (1)  || 19,528 || 4–2 || 1
|- style="text-align:center; background:#cfc;"
| 7 || April 8 || @ Angels || 3–2 || Dotel (1–0) || Santana (0–1) || Rauch (2) || 43,853 || 5–2 || ½
|-  style="text-align:center; background:#fbb;"
| 8 || April 9 || @ Angels || 6–5 (14) || Haren (2–0) || Rauch (0–1) || || 43,513 || 5–3 || 1
|-  style="text-align:center; background:#fbb;"
| 9 || April 10 || @ Angels || 3–1 || Weaver (3–0) || Reyes (0–1) || Rodney (2) || 43,525 || 5–4 || 1
|-  style="text-align:center; background:#fbb;"
| 10 || April 11 || @ Mariners || 8–7 || Lueke (1–0)  || Camp (0–1)  ||   || 13,056 || 5–5 || 1½
|-  style="text-align:center; background:#fbb;"
| 11 || April 12 || @ Mariners || 3–2 || Pineda (1–1) || Romero (1–1) || League (2) || 15,500 || 5–6 || 2
|-  style="text-align:center; background:#cfc;"
| 12 || April 13 || @ Mariners || 8–3 || Rzepczynski (1–0) || Ray (1–1)||  || 12,407 || 6–6 || 1
|-  style="text-align:center; background:#cfc;"
| 13 || April 15 || @ Red Sox || 7–6 || Cecil (1–1) || Jenks (0–1) || Rauch (3) || 37,467 || 7–6 || ½
|-  style="text-align:center; background:#fbb;"
| 14 || April 16 || @ Red Sox || 4–1 || Beckett (2–1)   || Reyes (0–2) || Papelbon (2) || 37,310  || 7–7 || 1½
|-  style="text-align:center; background:#fbb;"
| 15 || April 17 || @ Red Sox || 8–1  || Lester (1–1)   || Litsch (1–1)   ||   || 37,802 || 7–8 || 2½
|-  style="text-align:center; background:#fbb;"
| 16 || April 18 || @ Red Sox || 9–1  ||  Matsuzaka (1–2)  || Romero (1–2)  ||   || 37,916 ||  7–9   || 3
|- style="text-align:center; background:#cfc;"
| 17 || April 19 || Yankees || 6–5 (10) || Rauch (1–1)  || Nova (1–2)  ||   || 25,250 ||  8–9  ||  2
|-  style="text-align:center; background:#fbb;"
| 18 || April 20 || Yankees || 6–2  ||  Colón (1–1) || Cecil (1–2) || Soriano (1) || 26,062  ||  8–10 || 3
|-  style="text-align:center; background:#cfc;"
| 19 || April 22 || Rays || 6–4 (11) || Rzepczynski (2–0) || Russell (1–1) ||  || 23,129 || 9–10  || 2½
|-  style="text-align:center; background:#fbb;"
| 20 || April 23 || Rays || 6–4  || Price (3–2) || Morrow (0–1) || Farnsworth (5) || 21,826  || 9–11 || 3½
|-  style="text-align:center; background:#fbb;"
| 21 || April 24 || Rays || 2–0  || Shields (2–1) || Romero (1–3)  ||  || 14,456 || 9–12 || 4½
|-  style="text-align:center; background:#cfc;"
| 22 || April 25 || @ Rangers || 6–4  || Drabek (2–0)  || Lewis (1–3) ||  Rauch (4)  || 22,915 || 10–12 || 3½
|-  style="text-align:center; background:#cfc;"
| 23 || April 26 || @ Rangers || 10–3  || Litsch (2–1) || Harrison (3–2) ||  || 21,755 || 11–12  || 2½
|- style="text-align:center; background:#fbb;"
| 24 || April 27 || @ Rangers || 7–6 || Eppley (1–0) || Dotel (1–1) || Oliver (2) || 29,322 || 11–13  || 3½
|- style="text-align:center; background:#cfc;"
| 25 || April 28 || @ Rangers || 5–2 || Francisco (1–0) || Oliver (1–2) || || 24,121 ||  12–13 || 3½
|- style="text-align:center; background:#cfc;"
| 26 || April 29 || @ Yankees || 5–3  || Romero (2–3)  || García (1–1) || Rauch (5) || 40,830 || 13–13  || 2½
|- style="text-align:center; background:#fbb;"
| 27 || April 30 || @ Yankees || 5–4 || Burnett (4–1) || Drabek (2–1) || Rivera (9) || 42,460 || 13–14 || 3½
|-

|- style="text-align:center; background:#fbb;"
| 28 || May 1 || @ Yankees || 5–2 || Nova (2–2) || Litsch (2–2) || Rivera (10) || 43,363 || 13–15 || 4½
|- style="text-align:center; background:#fbb;"
| 29 || May 3 || @ Rays || 3–2  || Farnsworth (2–0) || Rauch (1–2) ||  || 10,248 || 13–16 || 5
|- style="text-align:center; background:#cfc;"
| 30 || May 4 || @ Rays || 3–2  || Morrow (1–1) || Niemann (1–4) || Francisco (1) || 10,099 ||  14–16   ||  4
|- style="text-align:center; background:#fbb;"
| 31 || May 5 || @ Rays || 3–1   || Price (4–3) || Drabek (2–2) || Farnsworth (6) || 12,682 ||  14–17   ||  4
|- style="text-align:center; background:#cfc;"
| 32 || May 6 || Tigers || 7–4 || Litsch (3–2) || Coke (1–5) || Francisco (2) || 19,711 || 15–17 || 4
|- style="text-align:center; background:#fbb;"
| 33 || May 7 || Tigers || 9–0  || Verlander (3–3)  || Romero (2–4) ||  || 23,453  || 15–18 || 4
|- style="text-align:center; background:#fbb;"
| 34 || May 8 || Tigers || 5–2  || Penny (3–3) || Reyes (0–3) || Valverde (7) || 17,392  || 15–19 || 5
|- style="text-align:center; background:#fbb;"
| 35 || May 9 || Tigers || 10–5  || Scherzer (6–0) || Morrow (1–2) ||  || 11,785 || 15–20 ||5½
|- style="text-align:center; background:#cfc;"
| 36 || May 10 || Red Sox || 7–6 (10) || Villanueva (1–0) || Albers (0–1) ||  || 17,820 || 16–20 ||5½
|- style="text-align:center; background:#cfc;"
| 37 || May 11 || Red Sox || 9–3 || Litsch (4–2) || Lackey (2–5) ||  || 19,163 || 17–20 ||4½
|- style="text-align:center; background:#cfc;"
| 38 || May 13 || @ Twins || 2–0 || Romero (3–4) || Burnett (0–2) || Francisco (3) || 38,809 || 18–20 ||5
|- style="text-align:center; background:#cfc;"
| 39 || May 14 || @ Twins || 9–3 (11)  || Rauch (2–2)  || Perkins (0–1) ||  || 39,934  ||  19–20  ||4
|- style="text-align:center; background:#cfc;"
| 40 || May 15 || @ Twins || 11–3 || Morrow (2–2) || Duensing (2–3) ||  || 39,301 || 20–20 ||3
|- style="text-align:center; background:#cfc;"
| 41 || May 16 || @ Tigers || 4–2 || Drabek (3–2) || Benoit (1–3) || Francisco (4) || 20,444 || 21–20 ||3
|-  style="text-align:center; background:#bbb;"
|–||  May 17 || @ Tigers || colspan=6|Postponed (rain) Rescheduled for June 27|| 2½
|- style="text-align:center; background:#fbb;"
| 42 || May 18 || Rays || 6–5 || Hellickson (5–2) || Litsch (4–3) || Farnsworth (9) || 14,415 || 21–21 || 3½
|- style="text-align:center; background:#cfc;"
| 43 || May 19 || Rays || 3–2 || Romero (4–4) || Davis (4–4) || Francisco (5) || 12,590 || 22–21 ||2½
|- style="text-align:center; background:#fbb;"
| 44 || May 20 || Astros || 5–2  || López (1–1) ||Francisco (1–1) || Melancon (2) || 15,478  || 22–22 ||2½
|- style="text-align:center; background:#cfc;"
| 45 || May 21 || Astros || 7–5  || Janssen (1–0) || Myers (1–4) ||Dotel (1) || 21,494  || 23–22   || 1½
|- style="text-align:center; background:#fbb;"
| 46 || May 22 || Astros || 3–2  || Rodríguez (3–3) || Drabek (3–3) || Melancon (3) || 19,487  ||  23–23  || 2½
|- style="text-align:center; background:#cfc;"
| 47 || May 23 || @ Yankees || 7–3 || Villanueva (2–0) || Colón (2–3) ||  || 41,946 || 24–23 ||1½
|- style="text-align:center; background:#fbb;"
| 48 || May 24 || @ Yankees || 5–4 || Sabathia (5–3) || Francisco (1–2) ||  || 41,549 || 24–24 || 2½
|- style="text-align:center; background:#fbb;"
| 49 || May 25 || @ Yankees || 7–3 || García (3–4) || Reyes (0–4) ||  || 43,201 || 24–25 || 3½
|- style="text-align:center; background:#fbb;"
| 50 || May 26 || White Sox || 3–1 || Crain (2–1) || Rzepczynski (2–1) || Santos (8) || 14,353 || 24–26 || 4
|- style="text-align:center; background:#cfc;"
| 51 || May 27 || White Sox || 4–2 || Janssen (2–0) || Buehrle (4–4) || Rauch (6) || 16,668 ||  25–26 || 4
|- style="text-align:center; background:#cfc;"
| 52 || May 28 || White Sox || 9–8 (14) || Pérez (1–0) || Floyd (5–5) ||  || 22,659  || 26–26 || 3½
|- style="text-align:center; background:#cfc;"
| 53 || May 29 || White Sox || 13–4 || Romero (5–4) || Danks (0–8) ||  || 18,325 || 27–26 || 3
|- style="text-align:center; background:#cfc;"
| 54 || May 30 || Indians || 11–1 || Reyes (1–4) || Carmona (3–6) ||  || 12,902 || 28–26 || 2
|- style="text-align:center; background:#fbb;"
| 55 || May 31 || Indians || 6–3 || Talbot (2–1) || Morrow (2–3) ||  || 14,556 || 28–27 || 2½
|-

|- style="text-align:center; background:#fbb;"
| 56 || June 1 || Indians || 13–9 || Tomlin (7–2) || Drabek (3–4) ||  || 15,397 || 28–28 || 3½
|- style="text-align:center; background:#cfc;"
| 57 || June 3 || @ Orioles || 8–4 || Villanueva (3–0) || Britton (5–4) ||  || 18,587 || 29–28 || 3
|- style="text-align:center; background:#fbb;"
| 58 || June 4 || @ Orioles || 5–3 || Arrieta (7–3)  || Romero (5–5) || Gregg (10) || 20,086 || 29–29 || 4
|- style="text-align:center; background:#cfc;"
| 59 || June 5 || @ Orioles || 7–4 || Reyes (2–4) || Guthrie (2–8) ||  || 25,431 || 30–29 || 4
|- style="text-align:center; background:#fbb;"
| 60 || June 6 || @ Royals || 3–2 (11) || Soria (4–3) || Francisco (1–3) ||   || 12,194 || 30–30 || 4½
|- style="text-align:center; background:#cfc;"
| 61 || June 7 || @ Royals || 8–5 || Drabek (4–4) || Mazzaro (0–1) || Rauch (7) || 16,539 || 31–30 || 3½
|- style="text-align:center; background:#cfc;"
| 62 || June 8 || @ Royals || 9–8  || Villanueva (4–0) || Duffy (0–2) || Janssen (1) || 12,152 || 32–30 || 3½
|- style="text-align:center; background:#fbb;"
| 63 || June 9 || @ Royals || 3–2 || Hochevar (4–6) || Romero (5–6) || Soria (8) || 13,941 || 32–31 || 4½
|- style="text-align:center; background:#fbb;"
| 64 || June 10 || Red Sox || 5–1 || Buchholz (5–3)  || Reyes (2–5) ||  ||  28,588 || 32–32 || 5½
|- style="text-align:center; background:#fbb;"
| 65 || June 11 || Red Sox || 16–4  || Lackey (4–5)  || Morrow (2–4) ||  || 39,437 || 32–33 || 6½
|- style="text-align:center; background:#fbb;"
| 66 || June 12 || Red Sox || 14–1  || Lester (9–2)  || Drabek (4–5) ||  || 30,364 || 32–34 || 7½
|- style="text-align:center; background:#cfc;"
| 67 || June 14 || Orioles || 6–5 (11)  || Camp (1–1) || Uehara (1–1) ||  || 15,592 || 33–34 || 6½
|- style="text-align:center; background:#cfc;"
| 68 || June 15 || Orioles || 4–1  || Romero (6–6) || Arrieta (8–4)   || Francisco (6) || 14,541 ||  34–34 || 6½
|- style="text-align:center; background:#fbb;"
| 69 || June 16 || Orioles || 4–3 || Berken (1–2) || Rauch (2–3) || Gregg (13) || 31,822 || 34–35 || 7½
|- style="text-align:center; background:#cfc;"
| 70 || June 17 || @ Reds || 3–2 || Reyes (3–5) || Leake (6–3) || Francisco (7) || 32,026 || 35–35 || 7½
|- style="text-align:center; background:#cfc;"
| 71 || June 18 || @ Reds ||  4–0  || Morrow (3–4) || Vólquez (4–3) ||  || 31,688 ||  36–35  || 6½
|- style="text-align:center; background:#fbb;"
| 72 || June 19 || @ Reds ||  2–1  || Arroyo (6–6) || Villanueva (4–1) || Cordero (5) || 32,618 || 36–36  || 7½
|- style="text-align:center; background:#fbb;"
| 73 || June 20 || @ Braves || 2–0   || Hudson (6–6)  || Romero (6–7) ||Kimbrel (20)  || 22,937  ||  36–37  || 8½
|- style="text-align:center; background:#fbb;"
| 74 || June 21 || @ Braves || 5–1  || Minor (1–2)  || Stewart (0–1) ||  || 26,849 ||  36–38 || 8½
|- style="text-align:center; background:#fbb;"
| 75 || June 22 || @ Braves || 5–1 || Beachy (2–1) || Reyes (3–6) ||  || 23,152 || 36–39 || 8½
|- style="text-align:center; background:#cfc;"
| 76 || June 24 || @ Cardinals || 5–4 || Frasor (2–1) || Salas (4–2) || Francisco (8) || 37,724 || 37–39 ||7½
|- style="text-align:center; background:#cfc;"
| 77 || June 25 || @ Cardinals || 6–3  ||  Villanueva (5–1) || García (6–3) ||  || 40,289  ||  38–39  || 7
|- style="text-align:center; background:#cfc;"
| 78 || June 26 || @ Cardinals || 5–0 || Romero (7–7) || McClellan (6–4) ||  || 36,542 || 39–39 || 7
|- style="text-align:center; background:#fbb;"
| 79 || June 27 || @ Tigers || 4–2  || Benoit (2–3)  || Rzepczynski (2–2) || Valverde (18) || 25,181  ||  39–40  || 7½
|- style="text-align:center; background:#fbb;"
| 80 || June 28 || Pirates || 7–6  || Correia (10–6) || Reyes (3–7) || Hanrahan (23) || 17,085 ||  39–41  || 8½
|- style="text-align:center; background:#cfc;"
| 81 || June 29 || Pirates || 2–1  || Morrow (4–4) || Maholm (4–9) || Francisco (9) || 15,632 || 40–41  || 8½
|- style="text-align:center; background:#fbb;"
| 82 || June 30 || Pirates || 6–2 || Karstens (6–4) || Cecil (1–3) ||  || 14,939 || 40–42 || 9½
|-

|- style="text-align:center; background:#fbb;"
| 83 || July 1 || Phillies || 7–6  || Báez (2–3) || Francisco (1–4) || Bastardo (4) || 45,512  || 40–43  || 10½
|- style="text-align:center; background:#fbb;"
| 84 || July 2 || Phillies || 5–3  || Halladay (11–3) || Pérez (1–1) ||  || 44,078 || 40–44 || 11½
|- style="text-align:center; background:#cfc;"
| 85 || July 3 || Phillies || 7–4 || Dotel (2–1) || Lee (9–6) || || 26,204 || 41–44 || 10½
|- style="text-align:center; background:#cfc;"
| 86 || July 4 || @ Red Sox || 9–7 || Morrow (5–4) || Lackey (5–8) || Francisco (10) || 38,072 || 42–44 || 9½
|- style="text-align:center; background:#fbb;"
| 87 || July 5 || @ Red Sox ||  3–2  || Albers (3–3) || Cecil (1–4)|| Papelbon (18) || 37,745 || 42–45 || 10½
|- style="text-align:center; background:#fbb;"
| 88 || July 6 || @ Red Sox || 6–4 || Wakefield (5–3) || Romero (7–8) || Papelbon (19) || 37,404 || 42–46 || 10½
|- style="text-align:center; background:#fbb;"
| 89 || July 7 || @ Indians || 5–4  || Sipp (4–1) || Pérez (1–2) || ||18,816 || 42–47 || 11
|- style="text-align:center; background:#cfc;"
| 90 || July 8 || @ Indians || 11–7 || Reyes (4–7) || Talbot (2–5) || || 25,835 || 43–47 || 11
|- style="text-align:center; background:#cfc;"
| 91 || July 9 || @ Indians || 5–4 (10) || Rauch (3–3) || Perez (2–4) || Camp (1) || 27,661 || 44–47 || 11
|- style="text-align:center; background:#cfc;"
| 92 || July 10 || @ Indians || 7–1 || Cecil (2–4) || Carrasco (8–6) || || 21,148 || 45–47 || 11
|- style="text-align:center; background:#cfc;"
| 93 || July 14 || Yankees || 16–7 || Reyes (5–7) || Colón (6–5) || || 37,342 || 46–47 || 10½
|- style="text-align:center; background:#cfc;"
| 94 || July 15 || Yankees || 7–1 || Morrow (6–4) || García (7–7) || || 33,525 || 47–47 || 9½
|- style="text-align:center; background:#fbb;"
| 95 || July 16 || Yankees || 4–1 || Sabathia (14–4) || Romero (7–9) || Rivera (23) || 45,606 || 47–48 || 10½
|- style="text-align:center; background:#fbb;"
| 96 || July 17 || Yankees || 7–2 || Hughes (1–2) || Villanueva (5–2) || || 36,586 || 47–49 || 11½
|- style="text-align:center; background:#cfc;"
| 97 || July 19 || Mariners || 6–5 (14) || Janssen (3–0) || Wright (2–3)  || || 15,957 || 48–49 || 11
|- style="text-align:center; background:#cfc;"
| 98 || July 20 || Mariners || 11–6 || Morrow (7–4) ||  Vargas (6–8) || || 18,093 || 49–49 || 11
|- style="text-align:center; background:#cfc;"
| 99 || July 21 || Mariners || 7–5 || Rauch (4–3) || Pauley (5–4) || || 23,146 || 50–49 || 10½
|- style="text-align:center; background:#fbb;"
| 100 || July 22 || @ Rangers || 12–2 || Lewis (10–7) || Reyes (5–8) || || 37,360 || 50–50 || 11½
|- style="text-align:center; background:#fbb;"
| 101 || July 23 || @ Rangers || 5–4 || Oliver (3–5) || Rzepczynski (2–3) || || 38,537 || 50–51 || 12½
|- style="text-align:center; background:#cfc;"
| 102 || July 24 || @ Rangers || 3–0 || Cecil (3–4) || Ogando (10–4) || || 43,117 || 51–51 || 12½
|- style="text-align:center; background:#fbb;"
| 103 || July 26 || Orioles || 12–4 || Arrieta (10–7) || Morrow (7–5) || || 17,477 || 51–52 ||13
|- style="text-align:center; background:#cfc;"
| 104 || July 27 || Orioles || 3–0 || Romero (8–9) || Simón (2–4) || Rauch (8) || 16,861 || 52–52 ||13
|- style="text-align:center; background:#cfc;"
| 105 || July 28 || Orioles || 8–5  || Villanueva (6–2) || Bergesen (2–7) || || 16,152 || 53–52 || 12
|- style="text-align:center; background:#cfc;"
| 106 || July 29 || Rangers || 3–2 || Cecil (4–4) || Ogando (10–5) || Rauch (9) || 19,287 || 54–52 || 11
|- style="text-align:center; background:#fbb;"
| 107 || July 30 || Rangers || 3–0 || Holland (10–4) || Mills (0–1) || || 22,560 || 54–53 || 12
|- style="text-align:center; background:#cfc;"
| 108 || July 31 || Rangers || 7–3 || Morrow (8–5) || Wilson (10–4) ||  || 45,629 || 55–53 || 12
|-

|- style="text-align:center; background:#cfc;"
| 109 || August 2 || @ Rays || 3–1 ||  Romero (9–9) || Price (9–10)  || Rauch (10) || 13,333 || 56–53 || 11½
|- style="text-align:center; background:#fbb;"
| 110 || August 3 || @ Rays || 9–1 || Shields (10–9) || Villanueva (6–3) || || 11,803 || 56–54 || 12½
|- style="text-align:center; background:#fbb;"
| 111 || August 4 || @ Rays || 7–6  || Gomes (1–1)  || Camp (1–2)  ||  || 28,491 || 56–55 || 12½
|- style="text-align:center; background:#cfc;"
| 112 || August 5 || @ Orioles || 5–4 || Mills (1–1) || Hunter (1–2) || Rauch (11) || 18,770 || 57–55 || 12½
|- style="text-align:center; background:#fbb;"
| 113 || August 6 || @ Orioles || 6–2 || Tillman (3–4) || Morrow (8–6) ||  || 19,396 || 57–56 || 12½
|- style="text-align:center; background:#cfc;"
| 114 || August 7 || @ Orioles || 7–2  || Romero (10–9) || Simón (3–5) ||  || 13,824 || 58–56 || 12½
|- style="text-align:center; background:#fbb;"
| 115 || August 9 || Athletics || 4–1 || Harden (3–2) || Cecil (4–5) || Bailey (14) || 20,521 || 58–57 ||14
|- style="text-align:center; background:#cfc;"
| 116 || August 10 || Athletics || 8–4 || Janssen (4–0) || González (9–10) || Litsch (1) || 19,541 || 59–57 || 13
|- style="text-align:center; background:#fbb;"
| 117 || August 11 || Athletics || 10–3 || Moscoso (5–6) || Mills (1–2) ||  || 27,918 || 59–58 ||13½
|- style="text-align:center; background:#fbb;"
| 118 || August 12 || Angels || 5–1 || Santana (9–8) || Morrow (8–7)  ||  || 24,731 || 59–59 || 14½
|- style="text-align:center; background:#cfc;"
| 119 || August 13 || Angels || 11–2  || Romero (11–9) || Weaver (14–6) ||  || 27,185 || 60–59 || 13½
|- style="text-align:center; background:#cfc;"
| 120 || August 14 || Angels || 5–4 (10) || Rauch (5–3) || Rodney (2–5) || || 23,355 || 61–59 || 12½
|- style="text-align:center; background:#fbb;"
| 121 || August 15 || @ Mariners || 6–5 || Wilhelmsen (1–0) ||  Rauch (5–4)  || League (30) || 28,530 || 61–60 || 13
|- style="text-align:center; background:#cfc;"
| 122 || August 16 || @ Mariners || 13–7 || Pérez (2–2) || Vargas (7–11)  || || 23,089 || 62–60 || 13
|- style="text-align:center; background:#cfc;"
| 123 || August 17 || @ Mariners || 5–1 || Morrow (9–7) || Beavan (3–4) ||  || 26,579 || 63–60 || 12
|- style="text-align:center; background:#cfc;"
| 124 || August 18 || @ Athletics || 7–0   || Romero (12–9) || Cahill (9–12) || || 12,220 || 64–60 || 12
|- style="text-align:center; background:#fbb;"
| 125 || August 19 || @ Athletics || 2–0  || Harden (4–2) || Cecil (4–6) || Bailey (16) || 13,174 || 64–61 || 13
|- style="text-align:center; background:#fbb;"
| 126 || August 20 || @ Athletics || 5–1   || González (10–11) || Álvarez (0–1) ||   || 28,434 || 64–62 || 13
|- style="text-align:center; background:#cfc;"
| 127 || August 21 || @ Athletics || 1–0  || Pérez (3–2) || Moscoso (6–7) || Janssen (2) || 16,811 || 65–62 || 13
|- style="text-align:center; background:#fbb;"
| 128 || August 23 || Royals || 6–4 || Chen (9–5) || Morrow (9–8) || Soria (23) || 20,009 || 65–63 || 13
|- style="text-align:center; background:#cfc;"
| 129 || August 24 || Royals || 4–3 || Litsch (5–3) || Coleman (1–3) || Francisco (11) || 18,292 || 66–63 ||13
|- style="text-align:center; background:#fbb;"
| 130 || August 25 || Royals || 9–6 || Francis (5–14) || Cecil (4–7) ||  || 17,355 || 66–64 || 14
|- style="text-align:center; background:#fbb;"
| 131 || August 26 || Rays || 6–1 || Shields (12–10) || Álvarez (0–2) || || 20,491 || 66–65 || 14
|- style="text-align:center; background:#fbb;"
| 132 || August 27 || Rays || 6–5 || Niemann (9–5) || Camp (1–3) || Peralta (2) || 24,052 ||  66–66 || 15½
|- style="text-align:center; background:#fbb;"
| 133 || August 28 || Rays || 12–0 || Price (12–11) || Morrow (9–9) ||  || 21,618 || 66–67  || 16
|- style="text-align:center; background:#cfc;"
| 134 || August 29 || Rays || 7–3 || Romero (13–9) || Davis (8–8) ||  || 19,725 || 67–67 || 15½
|- style="text-align:center; background:#fbb;"
| 135 || August 30 || @ Orioles || 6–5 (10) || Eyre (1–0) || Tallet (0–2) ||  || 10,756 || 67–68 ||15½
|- style="text-align:center; background:#cfc;"
| 136 || August 31 || @ Orioles || 13–0 || Álvarez (1–2) || Reyes (7–11) || || 14,211 || 68–68 ||15½
|-

|- style="text-align:center; background:#cfc;"
| 137 || September 1 || @ Orioles || 8–6 || Camp (2–3) ||  Eyre (1–1) || Francisco (12) || 11,617 || 69–68 || 14½
|- style="text-align:center; background:#fbb;"
| 138  || September 2 || @ Yankees || 3–2 || Nova (15–4) || Morrow (9–10) || Rivera (37) || 47,240 || 69–69 || 15
|- style="text-align:center; background:#fbb;"
| 139  || September 3 || @ Yankees || 6–4 || Logan (5–2) || Romero (13–10) || Robertson (1) || 47,744 || 69–70 || 16
|- style="text-align:center; background:#fbb;"
| 140 || September 4 || @ Yankees || 9–3 || Sabathia (19–7) || Cecil (4–8) ||  || 47,464 || 69–71 || 17
|- style="text-align:center; background:#cfc;"
| 141 || September 5 || Red Sox || 1–0 (11) || Camp (3–3) || Wheeler (2–2) || || 27,573 || 70–71 || 17
|- style="text-align:center; background:#fbb;"
| 142  || September 6 || Red Sox || 14–0 || Lester (15–6) || Pérez (3–3) || || 17,565 || 70–72 || 18
|- style="text-align:center; background:#cfc;"
| 143 || September 7 || Red Sox || 11–10 || Camp (4–3) || Bard (2–6) || Francisco (13) || 16,154 || 71–72 || 17
|- style="text-align:center; background:#cfc;"
| 144 || September 8 || Red Sox || 7–4 || Romero (14–10) || Miller (6–3) || || 17,189 || 72–72 || 16
|- style="text-align:center; background:#fbb;"
| 145 || September 9 || Orioles || 2–0 || Guthrie (7–17) || Cecil (4–9) || Johnson (4) || 13,918 || 72–73 || 16
|- style="text-align:center; background:#cfc;"
| 146 || September 10 || Orioles || 5–4 || Litsch (6–3) || Gregg (0–3) ||  || 17,742 || 73–73 || 15
|- style="text-align:center; background:#cfc;"
| 147 || September 11 || Orioles || 6–5 || Carreño (1–0) || Hunter (3–4) || Francisco (14) || 14,235 || 74–73 ||  15
|- style="text-align:center; background:#fbb;"
| 148 || September 13 || @ Red Sox || 18–6 || Wakefield (7–6) || Morrow (9–11) ||  || 38,020 || 74–74 ||  16½
|- style="text-align:center; background:#cfc;"
| 149 || September 14 || @ Red Sox || 5–4 || Romero (15–10) || Bard (2–8) || Francisco (15) || 37,087 || 75–74 || 15½
|- style="text-align:center; background:#cfc;"
| 150 || September 16 || Yankees || 5–4 || Janssen (5–0) || Logan (5–3) || || 29,323 || 76–74 || 14½
|- style="text-align:center; background:#fbb;"
| 151 || September 17 || Yankees || 7–6 || Laffey (3–2) || Villaneuva (6–4) || Rivera (42) || 39,288 || 76–75 || 15½
|- style="text-align:center; background:#cfc;"
| 152 || September 18 || Yankees || 3–0 || Morrow (10–11) || García (11–8) || Francisco (16) || 34,657 || 77–75 || 14½
|- style="text-align:center; background:#cfc;"
| 153 || September 19 || Angels || 3–2 (10) || Janssen (6–0) || Downs (6–3) || || 11,178 || 78–75 || 14½
|- style="text-align:center; background:#fbb;"
| 154 || September 20 || Angels || 10–6 || Piñiero (7–7)  || Cecil (4–10) || Downs (1) || 13,514 || 78–76  || 15½
|- style="text-align:center; background:#fbb;"
| 155 || September 21 || Angels || 7–2 || Haren (16–9)|| McGowan (0–1) || || 14,784 || 78–77 || 17
|- style="text-align:center; background:#cfc;"
| 156 || September 22 || Angels || 4–3 (12) || Camp (5–3) || Richards (0–2) || || 22,769 || 79–77 || 16
|- style="text-align:center; background:#cfc;"
| 157 || September 23 || @ Rays || 5–1 || Morrow (11–11) || Price (12–13) || || 18,093 || 80–77 || 15½
|- style="text-align:center; background:#fbb;"
| 158 || September 24 || @ Rays || 6–2  || Torres (1–1) || Romero (15–11) || || 27,773 || 80–78 || 16½
|- style="text-align:center; background:#fbb;"
| 159 || September 25 || @ Rays || 5–2 || Davis (11–10) || Cecil (4–11) || Peralta (6) || 21,008 || 80–79 || 17
|- style="text-align:center; background:#fbb;"
| 160 || September 26 || @ White Sox || 4–3 || Axelrod (1–0) || McGowan (0–2) || Santos (30) || 21,320 || 80–80 || 17
|- style="text-align:center; background:#fbb;"
| 161 || September 27 || @ White Sox || 2–1 || Buehrle (13–9) ||  Álvarez (1–3) || Sale (3) || 23,934  || 80–81 || 17
|- style="text-align:center; background:#cfc;"
| 162 || September 28 || @ White Sox || 3–2 || Camp (6–3) || Sale (2–2) || Francisco (17) || 20,524 || 81–81 || 16
|-

Player stats

Batting
Note: G = Games played; AB = At bats; R = Runs; H = Hits; 2B = Doubles; 3B = Triples; HR = Home runs; RBI = Runs batted in; SB = Stolen bases; BB = Walks; AVG = Batting average; SLG = Slugging average

Source:

Pitching
Note: W = Wins; L = Losses; ERA = Earned run average; G = Games pitched; GS = Games started; SV = Saves; IP = Innings pitched; H = Hits allowed; R = Runs allowed; ER = Earned runs allowed; BB = Walks allowed; SO = Strikeouts

Source:

Honours and awards
All-Star Game
 José Bautista, 2nd selection
 Ricky Romero, 1st selection
Home Run Derby
 José Bautista, 1st selection
Player of the Week
 Ricky Romero –  August 1–7 
Player of the Month
 José Bautista – April, May
Pitcher of the Month
 Ricky Romero – August
 Hank Aaron Award 
 José Bautista
Silver Slugger
 José Bautista – OF

Farm system

LEAGUE CHAMPIONS: New Hampshire, Vancouver

References

External links
2011 Toronto Blue Jays at Baseball Reference

Toronto Blue Jays seasons
Toronto Blue Jays
2011 in Canadian sports
2011 in Toronto